Hassan Hosny (June 19, 1931 – May 30, 2020) was an Egyptian actor and comedian. He was known for El Nazer ("The headmaster") (2000), El basha telmiz (2004) and Zaky Chan (2005). Widely regarded as a veteran of Egyptian cinema, his acting career spanned over 50 years and included performances in almost 500 films, television programs and theatre plays. He has been referred to as the Joker of Egyptian cinema.

Biography
Hassan Hosny was born in the citadel district of Cairo on June 19, 1936. Born to an entrepreneur father, he lost his mother when he was six years old. Described as a thespian during his school years, Hosny started acting in the 1960s in theatre plays as part of the Egyptian military's theatrical group. His breakthrough role came when he starred as a corrupt civil servant in the popular TV show 'My Dear Children, Thank You'. He then collaborated in major TV shows with superstars Faten Hamama, Salah Zulfikar and Farid Shawqi. Popularly known for his comedic style, he also established himself as a serious actor in dramas.

He married Magda in 1995, and they together had three daughters and a son. One of his daughters died of lymphoma.

In the 2018 Cairo International Film Festival, he was awarded the Faten Hamama award in recognition of his lifetime achievements and contribution to Egyptian cinema. At the ceremony, Hosny commented that he was extremely happy to accept the award while he was still alive.

Death
Hassan Hosny died on May 30, 2020, due to a sudden heart attack. He was buried in his family's cemetery outside Cairo. His last performance was in Sultana of Al Moez which aired during Ramadan in the same month.

Filmography

Television

Theater

 When father sleeps
 The nightmare
 On the sidewalk
 El wad Shatara
 Walnut and almond
 Afrotto
 Wives of Hala
 The House of the Late
 Beautiful explosion
 Mind you crazy
 Endurance in the hands of my mother-in-law
 Hold me tight
 Me, her and the Computer
 The Hanim's car
 Girls Marriage
 Sons of Raya and Sakina
 Extra sugar
 Cinderella and praise
 Nonsense
 Cream and honey
 Tarzan
 Red love
 The swing
 Foolish
 Musaylimah the liar
 Game of Love
 The Bomb of the Season
 Hiran dumps

Notes

References

External links
 

1936 births
Egyptian male film actors
Egyptian male television actors
Egyptian comedians
2020 deaths
Egyptian Muslims
Male actors from Cairo